LaRue County High School is a public school in Hodgenville, Kentucky.

References

Schools in LaRue County, Kentucky
Public high schools in Kentucky
Hodgenville, Kentucky